Bowerhope is a village off the A708, in the Scottish Borders area of Scotland, on the banks of St Mary's Loch in Ettrick Forest.

See also
List of places in the Scottish Borders
List of places in Scotland

External links

RCAHMS record for Bowerhope

Villages in the Scottish Borders